Rusinov is a Russian masculine surname, its feminine counterpart is Rusinova. It may refer to
Dmytro Rusinov (born 1990), Ukrainian biathlete
Mikhail Rusinov (1909–2004), Russian optical scientist
Roman Rusinov (born 1981), Russian auto racing driver
Svilen Rusinov (born 1964), Bulgarian boxer

See also 
Rušinov, a village and municipality in the Czech Republic

References

Russian-language surnames